Arcanum High School is a public high school in Arcanum, Ohio.  It is the only high school in the Arcanum-Butler Local School District.

Ohio High School Athletic Association State Championships
 Boys Basketball – 1956, 1969
 Boys Track and Field - 1969

External links
 District Website

Notes and references

High schools in Darke County, Ohio
Public high schools in Ohio